The Sango Fighter games are a series of fighting game for DOS made by the Taiwanese Panda Entertainment. Set in the Three Kingdoms period of Chinese history, it is very similar to Street Fighter and Samurai Shodown, but with historical context.

"Sango" is a rough romanization of Three Kingdoms. Using pinyin, it would be romanized as "san guo".

Sango Fighter

The first Sango Fighter game was originally published by Panda Entertainment and released in 1993 for PC/AT platform.

Shareware developer and publisher Apogee Software was planning on licensing and releasing the game in the United States under the title Violent Vengeance, but the plans for the deal fell through. Instead, the game was distributed in English under its original title by a Taiwanese company named Accend, albeit without official permission from Panda Entertainment.

In 1995, Taiwan's fledgling 16-bit Super A'can game console saw release of a cartridge version of Sango Fighter, completely programmed inhouse by a single employee of Panda Entertainment. Being a rushed port from the PC version, the A'can adaptation suffered from awkward gameplay and quite a few glitches.

Sango Fighter was also released for the Japanese PC-98 computer, in 1995. For this release, a portion of the game's story text was translated into Japanese. It was otherwise identical to the original DOS version, upon which its code was based. This adaptation was produced by Great Co., Ltd., and released by Imagineer.

The game was illegally ported to the Sega Master System console, with the name Sangokushi, and released only in South Korea. This port is one of the larger games in the console library, with 8 megabits of data size.

While Sango Fighter was quite popular in Taiwan, a lawsuit by C&E Inc. (producers of the PC fighting game Super Fighter) stopped Panda Entertainment from distributing the game, let alone adapting it to other machines. Thus the game was never able to reach its full market potential.

On February 24, 2009, the full legal rights to both Sango Fighter and its sequel were acquired by the North American company Super Fighter Team. Following this, on June 18, 2009, both Chinese and English language editions of the game were released as a free download on the Official Sango Fighter Website. An updated version of the game was released, also as freeware, on February 15, 2011. It featured several significant changes and additions. The current Super Fighter Team version supports English, Chinese and Japanese languages, with Japanese based on the PC-9801 release of the game with newly translated text.

On December 24, 2021, Sango Fighter Special Edition was released as a free download for Windows. This version of the game contains elements from both the MS-DOS and Super A'can editions, and features new material such as a remixed and expanded soundtrack, and rebalanced fight system.

There may have also been a planned, but unfinished 3D sequel by Panda Entertainment. However, the former owner of Panda's intellectual properties stated that no records of any such title exist.

Reception
Sango Fighter drew much attention of PC gamers when it was released, offering the first fighting game with great graphics for that time and became the definitive fighting game for DOS. The game came in six 1.44 MB floppy disks, considered a large size compared with other games of the same genre.

Computer Gaming World in 1994 stated that "Game play in Sango Fighter is very good, on par with the PC version of Street Fighter". It praised the graphics and sound: "the overall quality of this release is equivalent to any commercial offering". The magazine concluded that the $30 shareware registration fee "is a good value, and comes recommended".

Sango Fighter 2

A sequel was released in 1995, Sango Fighter 2, with more characters and more detailed graphics. Sango Fighter 2 also featured a conquest mode in which the player attempted to unify the empire by invading other nations. In addition, the kingdom of Wu was added to the game.

On November 6, 2013, Sango Fighter 2 was released as a free download on the Official Sango Fighter 2 Website. In addition to being translated into English, the updated game also features several new additions and enhancements. 
The Super Fighter Team version supports English, Chinese and Korean languages.

Characters
The following is a list of the characters from Sango Fighter and Sango Fighter 2.

Cao Cao is not a playable character in Sango Fighter 2, but he retains a role as a character within the story. Liu Bei, Sun Quan, Sima Yi, Zhuge Liang and Zhou Yu also serve as story characters.

Even though Sun Ce served as leader of the kingdom of Wu historically before his death, in Sango Fighter 2, he is made a subordinate of his younger brother.

References

External links
Super Fighter Team page: Sango Fighter, Sango Fighter 2
Super Fighter versus Sango Fighter: Chinese War Ends in America 

DOS games
1993 video games
Master System games
NEC PC-9801 games
Sega Genesis games
Video games based on Romance of the Three Kingdoms
Fighting games
Unauthorized video games
Video games developed in Taiwan